Scott Hamilton (born December 11, 1957) is a former Canadian politician, who was elected to the Legislative Assembly of British Columbia in the 2013 provincial election. He represented the electoral district of Delta North as a member of the British Columbia Liberal Party.

He served as Chair of the Select Standing Committee on Finance and Government Services, as well as several other committees of the Legislative Assembly.

Delta City Council
Hamilton was first elected to Delta, British Columbia City Council in 2002 and was re-elected in 2005, 2008 and 2011. He served on several committees and commissions in his years on Delta Council. Most notably, he is responsible for advocating a new housing policy that resulted in a more progressive framework, and led to greater options for secondary housing opportunities in Delta.

He is currently the managing director for Quadrant Management Ltd, a property development and project management company that provides services to a variety of established industrial and commercial clients.

Personal life
Hamilton and his wife Kristen have lived in North Delta since 1986. They have two grown daughters. Prior to his election to the 40th Legislative Assembly of British Columbia Hamilton was employed in the information technology business.

Electoral record

References

British Columbia Liberal Party MLAs
British Columbia municipal councillors
Living people
People from Delta, British Columbia
21st-century Canadian politicians
1957 births